Michal Vabroušek (born 21 May 1975 in Prague) is a Czech rower.

Vabrousek started his international career rowing for Czechoslovakia at the 1992 World Rowing Junior Championships in Montreal, Canada. He competed at the 1996 and 2004 Olympics.

References 

1975 births
Living people
Czech male rowers
Rowers from Prague
Olympic rowers of the Czech Republic
Rowers at the 1996 Summer Olympics
Rowers at the 2004 Summer Olympics
World Rowing Championships medalists for the Czech Republic